RTV may refer to:

Television channels and public broadcasters

Asia 
 RTV (Bangladeshi TV channel), a satellite television channel
 RTV (Indonesian TV network), an Indonesian television network
 Rediffusion Television, a former television station in Hong Kong (later known as Asia Television)

Europe 
 RTV-7, a Dutch television network with programming from the Dutch Caribbean
 RTV NH, a public broadcasting station which focuses on news from North Holland, Netherlands
 RTV Noord, a radio and television public broadcaster in Groningen, Netherlands
 RTV Rijnmond, a public broadcast organization in Rijnmond, Netherlands
 RTV Slovenija, a public broadcaster in Slovenia
 RTV Utrecht, a regional television and radio broadcaster in Utrecht Province of the Netherlands
 Radio Television of Vojvodina, a public broadcaster in Serbia
 San Marino RTV, a public broadcaster in the microstate of San Marino

North America 

 Retro Television Network, or RTV, a United States television network

Oceania 

 VTV (Australian TV station), which had the proposed callsign of RTV

Other
 Return to vendor
 Ritonavir, an antiretroviral drug
 RTV silicone, a type of silicone rubber
 Room-temperature vulcanization, of silicone rubber

